Gervase Eyre (1669 – 16 February 1704) was an English MP for Nottinghamshire.

Eyre was the son of Anthony Eyre of Rampton, Nottinghamshire and his second wife Elizabeth Pakington, daughter of Sir John Pakington, 2nd Baronet, of Westwood, Worcestershire. He was educated at Christ Church, Oxford and trained in the law at the Inner Temple (1686). He succeeded his father in 1671 at the age of two.

Eyre was appointed as a deputy-lieutenant of Nottinghamshire in 1692 and as High Sheriff of Nottinghamshire for 1696–97. He was elected a knight of the shire (MP) for Nottinghamshire in 1698 and was re-elected in 1702.

Eyre died in London in 1704 and was buried in the chancel of All Saints’ church, Rampton.  He had married Catherine Cooke, the daughter and eventual heiress of Sir Henry Cooke, 2nd Baronet of Wheatley, and with whom he had 7 sons and 6 daughters. He was succeeded by his son Anthony.

References

1669 births
1704 deaths
High Sheriffs of Nottinghamshire
Deputy Lieutenants of Nottinghamshire
Alumni of Christ Church, Oxford
Members of the Inner Temple
17th-century English lawyers
English MPs 1698–1700
English MPs 1702–1705
People from Bassetlaw District